Hypsibarbus birtwistlei is a species of ray-finned fish in the genus Hypsibarbus from Peninsular Malaya and Sumatra.

References 

birtwistlei
Fish described in 1940